Rolls-Royce (always hyphenated) may refer to:

 Rolls-Royce Limited, a British manufacturer of cars and later aero engines, founded in 1906, now defunct

Automobiles
 Rolls-Royce Motor Cars, the current car manufacturing company incorporated in 1998, a subsidiary of BMW Group
 Rolls-Royce Motors, owner of the former car division incorporated in 1973, bought by Vickers in 1980, a subsidiary of Volkswagen Group from 1998 to 2002
 List of Rolls-Royce motor cars

Aerospace and nuclear power
 Rolls-Royce Holdings plc, an aerospace, power systems and defence company and Rolls-Royce's current principal operating company
Rolls-Royce Deutschland
Rolls-Royce Power Systems
 Rolls-Royce Marine Power Operations
 Rolls-Royce North America
 Rolls-Royce Turbomeca
 Rolls-Royce Kamawea, now Kamewa
 Rolls-Royce Controls and Data Services

See also
 Rose Royce, an American soul and R&B group
 Roll (disambiguation)
 Royce (disambiguation)

 
British brands